Nels Stefan David Peterson (born September 17, 1978) is an American lawyer serving as the presiding justice of the Supreme Court of Georgia.

Biography

Peterson graduated from Kennesaw State University with a Bachelor of Science in political science and a minor in economics. He received his Juris Doctor from Harvard Law School.

Upon graduation from law school, Peterson served as a law clerk to Judge William H. Pryor Jr. of the United States Court of Appeals for the Eleventh Circuit. He then practiced at King & Spalding in Atlanta, where he focused on securities litigation, corporate governance litigation, merger-related litigation, and appellate litigation. He was then appointed as former Gov. Sonny Perdue’s executive counsel. He then served as Solicitor General of Georgia under the direction of then Attorney General Sam Olens. He is a member of the Federalist Society.

Judicial career

Georgia Court of Appeals 

Peterson was appointed to the Georgia Court of Appeals by Governor Nathan Deal for a term starting January 1, 2016. He was appointed after the state legislature expanded the composition of the court from 12 to 15 seats. His appointment was considered unconstitutional by some in the legal community, but it was ultimately upheld by the Supreme Court of Georgia.

Georgia Supreme Court 
Governor Nathan Deal appointed Peterson to the Supreme Court of Georgia effective January 1, 2017. He was unanimously selected as presiding justice and sworn in on July 18, 2022.

Personal life
Peterson is married to his wife Jennifer and they have two children. They reside in Marietta, Georgia.

Electoral history
2018

References

External links
 Biography on Georgia Supreme Court website
 

|-

|-

1978 births
Living people
21st-century American lawyers
21st-century American judges
Federalist Society members
Georgia Court of Appeals judges
Georgia (U.S. state) lawyers
Georgia (U.S. state) Republicans
Harvard Law School alumni
Kennesaw State University alumni
Justices of the Supreme Court of Georgia (U.S. state)
Solicitors General of Georgia